GOOD Worldwide Inc., is a United States-based company with offices in Los Angeles, New York, and Seattle that reports on businesses and non-profits. GOOD produces a website, a quarterly magazine, online videos, and events. Content covered includes environmental issues, education, urban planning, design, politics, culture, technology, and health. Good Worldwide Inc. is the consolidation of originally separate brands: Reason Pictures, GOOD magazine, and GOOD Digital, in partnership with Causes, a Facebook/MySpace app promoting donations of time and money to charities and non-profits; Goodrec and Govit, an application that connects US citizens with their elected representatives. GOOD Worldwide Inc. is made up of three organizations: GOOD/Media, GOOD/Community and GOOD/Corps.

Brands  
GOOD/Media produces an online news site, www.good.is, and quarterly print magazine, GOOD magazine. The magazine was started in 2006.

GOOD Corps is GOOD Worldwide Inc's social impact consultancy.

Upworthy, a website for viral content started in March 2012 by Eli Pariser and Peter Koechley, merged with Good Worldwide in 2017.

History 
GOOD was founded in 2006 by Ben Goldhirsh (son of Inc. magazine founder Bernie Goldhirsh) who wanted to create a "free press for the critical idealist." Eschewing experienced editors, he hired friends from college and high school, including Al Gore's son, Al Gore III, to create a media company characterized by "both bold graphic style and an unconventional approach to business." The team was initially criticized by some industry experts, such as magazine executive and publishing expert Chip Block, who said, "This sounds a lot to me like vanity publishing, a bunch of kids sitting around with something they think is a  really good idea, and one of them has a lot of money." Others in the industry praised the magazine's design and concept upon its launch.

GOOD's business strategy included donating its magazine subscription fees entirely to charities, offering subscribers multiple options for which organization their fee supported. Goldhirsh explained the reasoning behind the strategy in an interview with Inc.: "The idea was that we would incentivize consumers with the added benefit that their money goes to charity, incentivize these charities to reach their constituencies for the $20 donation, and enjoy the added marketing and public relations that would come from having an innovative strategy." Goldhirsh's theory has been criticized for not being a viable business model.

Around launch time in the fall of 2006, GOOD was featured in the New York Times and mentioned by APM's Marketplace. The magazine and its website were covered by NPR Instead of traditional marketing strategies, GOOD used their marketing budget to throw launch parties which have been reviewed and discussed by publications such as The Washington Post.

In 2008, Former GOOD CEO Jonathan Greenblatt tested a concept called the "GOOD Sheet", a broadsheet product distributed exclusively at Starbucks. The company also experimented with a name-your-own-pricing scheme.

On August 17, 2011, a joint announcement was made that social network service Jumo, a social engagement platform designed to connect users with causes and non-profits, founded by Facebook cofounder Chris Hughes, would be merging with GOOD.

In June 2012, most of the magazine's editors were fired. The firings were "for strategic reasons" to shift GOOD's focus to its social network. Eight former GOOD magazine editors and writers raised funds on Kickstarter to create the one-shot magazine Tomorrow before going their separate ways.

In March 2015, GOOD resumed publication of the magazine with a new design and format. In 2017, the magazine received a National Magazine Award  in the Personal Service category for the Winter issue, ″What Can He Really Do, What Can We Do About It?″ 

In February 2016, Good Worldwide hired Nancy Miller, formerly of Wired, Fast Company, and Los Angeles magazine, to serve as editor-in-chief of the digital and print magazine.

In August 2018, Good Media Group laid off 31 employees from its Upworthy site. In response, Upworthy CEO Charlie Wilkie resigned, and Eli Pariser resigned from the board.

References

External links 
 
 Los Angeles Times profile of Ben Goldhirsh

Visual arts magazines published in the United States
Quarterly magazines published in the United States
Magazines established in 2006
English-language magazines
Magazine publishing companies of the United States